Bellary Raghava (Telugu: బళ్ళారి  రాఘవ; born Tadipatri Raghavacharyulu; 2 August 1880 – 16 April 1946) was an Indian playwright and actor, known for his works predominantly in Telugu theatre and cinema. His uncle Dharmavaram Ramakrishnamacharyulu was a pioneering dramatist in Telugu, and initiated him on the stage. Raghava was also associated with another dramatist from Ballari, Kolachalam Srinivasa Rao. His students include female artists like Sarojini Kopparapu, Padmavati Kommuri, Annapurna Kakinada, and  male artists like Vasudevarao K.S., Apparao Basavaraju and Banda Kanakalingeswara Rao.

Early life
Raghava studied at Bellary High School and at Christian College, Madras. He then practiced law after graduating from Madras Law College in 1905. Aged 12, he founded Shakespeare Club in Ballari and played in Shakespeare dramas. Raghava also portrayed main characters in various dramas in the Sreenivasarao Kolachalam's group "Sumanohara" in Bangalore. In 1909 he founded the Amateur Dramatic Association of Bangalore.

Notable theatre works
Harischandra, Padukapattabhishekamu, Savitri, Brihannala, Ramaraju charitra, Ramadasu, Tappevaridi, Saripadani sangatulu, etc. were his noted dramas. He visited various countries like Sri Lanka, England, France, Germany and Switzerland and gave seminars and lectures on Indian drama art. He advocated and developed the naturalistic style in acting. He was very particular that women should always play female roles on the stage. In 1927 he went to England and took part in English dramas with Laurence Olivier and Charles Laughton. His presentation of Tappevaridi by Rajamannar in 1930 in Madras, has received critical reception as a momentous event heralding a new era in Telugu theatre.

Cinema
In 1936, Raghava played Duryodhana in H. M. Reddy's Draupadi Maanasamrakshanam. He then acted in Raithu Bidda (1939) and Chandika (1940), and has garnered critical acclaim.

Death
Raghava died on 16 April 1946. The Ballari Raghava Puraskaram award was instituted in his memory. It is presented to talented artists who contributed to drama and cinema. In 1981, a postal stamp was released in his memory.

References

1880 births
1946 deaths
People from Anantapur, Andhra Pradesh
Telugu-language writers
Indian arts administrators
Indian theatre directors
20th-century Indian dramatists and playwrights
Indian male dramatists and playwrights
Telugu-language dramatists and playwrights
University of Madras alumni
People from Anantapur district
20th-century Indian male actors
Indian male film actors
Dramatists and playwrights from Andhra Pradesh
Male actors in Telugu cinema
19th-century Indian male actors
Male actors in Telugu theatre
Indian male stage actors
19th-century Indian dramatists and playwrights
Male actors from Andhra Pradesh
20th-century Indian male writers
Male actors in British India
Dramatists and playwrights in British India